Dogoso, or Black Dogose (Doghosie-Fing), is a Gur language of Burkina Faso. Other than Khe, with which it is 50–60% lexically similar, is distant from other languages, including the neighboring Dogosé language.

Names include Bambadion-Dogoso ~ Bambadion-Dokhosié and variations on 'Black Dogose': Dorhosié-Finng, Dorossié-Fing, Dorhosié-Noirs.

References

Gur languages
Languages of Burkina Faso